Anna Trapnell ( fl. 1650s), was an alleged prophetess active in England in the 1650s, associated with the Fifth Monarchists whom she joined in 1652.

Early life
Anna Trapnell was born sometime during the 1630s in Stepney, England, in the Parish of St. Dunstan's. Her father was a shipwright, and brought his family up in a Thameside maritime parish that was rife with wealth disparity. Despite not having been baptized, Trapnell had religious zeal at a very early age, and is quoted as having said: "When a child, the Lord awed my spirit, and so for the least trespass, my heart was smitten". She claims that her first recorded vision occurred after the death of her mother in 1647.

Journey into Cornwall
In January 1654, Trapnell fell into a trance for eleven or twelve days, during which time she sang, prayed and prophesied before a large crowd of people. Her trance and the news of it propelled her to fame around England. She was sharply critical of the Protectorate government of Oliver Cromwell, and she preached equality of the sexes. She was considered mad. 

Anna Trapnell travelled to Cornwall following a dream.  In April 1654 she was arrested on charges of disturbing the peace, and brought before the magistrates in Truro. Anticipating that she would be considered a taciturn witch she overwhelmed the court with verbosity. Judges asked her questions about the reasons for her travels and her purpose for preaching. She responded with questions, parables, and quotations from the Bible. The intense questioning and the ambiguity of her responses is reminiscent of the trial of Jesus before the Crucifixion. Whether this report of her trial is accurate, however, is debatable, for the only of account of Anna Trapnell's trial is her own.

Trapnell was subsequently transported from Cornwall to London and imprisoned by order of the Council of State at Bridewell. She was released in July 1654. She continued her prophesies upon her release, and accounts of her activities were recorded in Strange and Wonderful Newes from White-Hall, The Cry of a Stone, A Legacy for Saints, and Anna Trapnel's Report and Plea, all published in 1654.

Legacy

Anna Trapnell was a revolutionary woman writer, for she gained notoriety during a time when women were dismissed as incompetent.  Her motivations are not known, and the accuracy of her stories is questionable considering they were all first-person accounts. However, the influence of her preaching and the size of her audience are impressive.

Works
 A Narrative of Her Journey Into Cornwall. — a biography including details of the trial.

Notes

References
Hobby, Elaine. Virtue of necessity: English women's writing 1649–88. University of Michigan, 1989.
Wright, Stephanie Hodgson. Women's writings of the early modern period 1588–1688. Edinburgh University, 2002.
Magro, Maria. "Spiritual Biography and Radical Sectarian Women's Discourse: Anna Trapnel and the Bad Girls of the English Revolution". Journal of Medieval and Modern Studies, 2004.

External links
cris cheek's performance of Anna Trapnel March 26 2008

1630s births
Year of birth unknown
Year of death unknown
17th-century English women writers
17th-century English writers
English pamphleteers
Feminism and history
Feminism and spirituality
Fifth Monarchists
People from Stepney
Women in the English Civil War